Ice hockey in Russia is one of the most popular sports in the country.

History
In 1908, representatives of Russian ice hockey received an invitation to visit Paris to discuss the possibility of uniting hockey fans, along with France, Great Britain, Switzerland, Belgium, and Germany. In 1908, the First Congress of the International Ice Hockey Federation was formed without Russia.The Russian Hockey Federation was added to the Ligue Internationale de Hockey sur Glace (LIHG) (as the IIHF was known then) in 1911.

The USSR ice hockey championship began to be played in 1946. At first, the All-Union hockey section was organizing the championships. Since 1959, the organization has become known as the USSR Hockey Federation, which united the hockey with the ball and hockey with the puck. In 1967, the Federation was divided into the Federation of Ice Hockey (USSR) and the USSR Ice Hockey Federation. Hockey in Russia was engaged in the Federation of Hockey RSFSR, formed in 1959. The Federation of Hockey of the RSFSR / Russia (FHR) was established in 1991. In 1992, the FHR became the successor to the USSR Hockey Federation. Vladimir Petrov was elected president of the FHR. In 1994, Petrov was removed from the post of president, Valentin Sych was elected the new president. On 21 April 1997, the president of FHR, Valentin Sych was killed. On 30 May 1997, Alexander Steblin was elected the new president. In 2006, Steblin resigned, Vladislav Tretiak was elected president of the FHR.

After the 2022 Russian invasion of Ukraine, the International Ice Hockey Federation suspended Russia from all levels of competition.

Domestic league

Ice hockey was popularized by Canadians introduced to the Soviet Union in 1932. 
Anatoly Tarasov is considered the father of Soviet ice hockey. During the Soviet Union period the Soviet Championship League was the premier ice hockey league. After the fall of communism it was followed by the Russian Superleague and then the Kontinental Hockey League. On 26 March 2009, at the joint meeting of the clubs of the Kontinental Hockey League (KHL), the Russian Hockey Federation and the leadership of the KHL, the Youth Hockey League. On 21 August 2015, instead of the FHR Council and the executive committee of the FHR, the Federation Board was established. Arkady Rotenberg was elected chairman of the board.

National team

The Soviet Union entered its first Winter Olympics tournament in 1956, and would dominate the hockey world championship and Olympic tournaments from the 1950s to 1980s. The Soviet Union enjoyed a position where it could use its best players while Canada and many others were barred from doing that as their players were classified as professionals.

After the collapse of the Soviet Union, many Russian hockey players left to the United States to play in the National Hockey League (NHL), with such notable players as Viacheslav Fetisov, Alexander Mogilny, and Sergei Federov.

On the international stage, Russia considered Canada its major hockey rival. During this period the Russian national team, having won the 1993 World Championship, for a long time remained without medals at all. At the World Championships in Moscow in 2007 Russians stumbled in the semifinals, then in 2008, they regained the title of world champions after defeating the Canadians in Quebec. A final match, during which Russia lost 2: 4, ended in victory in overtime with a score of 5: 4. A year later at the 2009 championship in Bern, the Russian team again defeated the national team of Canada in the final with a score of 2: 1. At the 2010 World Championships, held in Cologne, the Russian team took only second place, losing in the finals of the Czech team. In 2012, the Russian team won gold for the fourth time. In 2014, she became a five-time champion.

References

External links

Official website
IIHF profile